Gods Will Be Watching is a point-and-click adventure video game created by Spain-based indie development studio Deconstructeam and published by Devolver Digital, released on 24 July 2014. Described as a "point-and-click thriller", the game revolves around a core mechanic of resource and time management, in which the player is placed in various scenarios and tasked to avert a crisis. The iOS port of Gods Will Be Watching was released on 17 December 2015.

Gameplay 
Gods Will Be Watching is a point-and-click adventure game with emphasis on the player's decision making. It features six chapters, each of which acts as a resource and time management puzzle. The player's goal in each chapter is to lead a group of characters through various circumstances in a fixed amount of time, often having to make moral decisions. The player can click on the ground to move, and on other characters to speak with them and give them orders. Options given to the player include, for example, choosing to kill a group member in order to reserve rations for the rest of the group.

Plot 
The game is set in a far future science fiction setting, playing in 2257 CFD (Constellar Federation Date), with the player assuming the role of an agent of the neutral organization known as Everdusk Company for the Universe Knowledge (E.C.U.K.), Sgt. Burden. The first chapter begins with Burden infiltrating the idealistic resistance movement known as Xenolifer, with his task being to aid in a hacking operation.

Development 
Gods Will Be Watching was originally developed as an entry for the Ludum Dare game jam #26, the theme being minimalism. The original version was created across a span of 72 hours and featured a single scenario, akin to a chapter in the final game. It ranked second place in the competition, losing to Leaf Me Alone by Mark Foster and David Fenn.

After the development competition, Deconstructeam launched a crowdfunding campaign on Indiegogo for the development of a full game, with a goal of €8,000. The campaign ended on 15 August 2013, having raised €20,385, or $21,242 in U.S. dollars. The game was released worldwide on 24 July 2014, for Microsoft Windows, OS X, and Linux.

An epilogue was added to the game as a free download in May 2015.

As the game was already announced for a release on iOS and Android, Abstraction Games took on the development of the game's mobile versions, where the Android release date is still to be announced.

Reception 

The PC version received "mixed" reviews according to the review aggregation website Metacritic. Critics praised it for its minimalist pixel art style, interesting story, and novel take on adventure games, but criticism was levied for its repetitiveness, tediousness, and excessive challenge. The primary concern of reviewers was the trial and error nature of the gameplay and the lack of checkpoints, requiring multiple, time-consuming attempts at single scenarios.

Rowan Kaiser of IGN praised the game's simplicity and tense story, calling it "a demonstration that even with the simplest of interfaces and old-fashioned graphics, new combinations of storytelling with gameplay are possible."

References

External links 
 
 Gods Will Be Watching at Devolver Digital
 Gods Will Be Watching Ludum Dare development page at Deconstructeam
 Gods Will Be Watching post-Ludum Dare development page at Deconstructeam
 Gods Will Be Watching at Ludum Dare
 

2014 video games
Android (operating system) games
Devolver Digital games
GameMaker Studio games
Indie video games
IOS games
Linux games
MacOS games
Point-and-click adventure games
Science fiction video games
Video games developed in Spain
Windows games